Telefoni bianchi (White Telephones, internationally released as The Career of a Chambermaid) is a 1976  Italian comedy film directed by Dino Risi. For this film Agostina Belli was awarded with a Special David di Donatello for her performance. The title refers to the White Telephone comedies of the 1930s and 1940s. The film is a comic portrayal of the Italian film industry during the Fascist era in which an ambitious young woman briefly rises to become a film star.

Cast 
 Agostina Belli: Marcella Valmarín
 Cochi Ponzoni: Roberto Trevisan
 Maurizio Arena: Luciani
 William Berger: Franz
 Lino Toffolo: Gondrano
 Vittorio Gassman: Franco D’Enza
 Ugo Tognazzi: Adelmo
 Renato Pozzetto: Lt. Bruni
 Dino Baldazzi: Benito Mussolini
 Paolo Baroni: Gabriellino
 Alvaro Vitali: Mario, the son in the brothel

See also 
 List of Italian films of 1976
 Telefoni Bianchi

References

Bibliography
Gundle, Stephen. Mussolini's Dream Factory: Film Stardom in Fascist Italy. Berghahn Books, 2013.

External links

1976 films
Films set in Venice
Films set in Rome
Commedia all'italiana
Films directed by Dino Risi
Italian comedy films
Films about fascists
Films set in the 1930s
Films set in the 1940s
Films about filmmaking
Self-reflexive films
Films with screenplays by Ruggero Maccari
Films scored by Armando Trovajoli
1976 comedy films
Cultural depictions of Benito Mussolini
1970s Italian-language films
1970s Italian films